This is a list of British television related events from 1995.

Events

January
2 January – The network television premiere of The Doors, Oliver Stone's critically acclaimed biopic of Jim Morrison on BBC2, starring Val Kilmer.
3 January – The legal drama Kavanagh QC makes its debut on ITV, starring John Thaw. 
4 January – The network television premiere of Chris Walas' 1989 horror sequel The Fly II on ITV, starring Eric Stoltz, Daphne Zuniga, Lee Richardson and John Getz with a special appearance from Jeff Goldblum.
16 January – BBC World Service Television is renamed BBC World at 7pm GMT as the international free-to-air news channel. 
24 January – Martine McCutcheon makes her EastEnders debut as Tiffany Raymond, later Mitchell.
26 January – Launch of BBC World and BBC Prime, successors to BBC World Service Television. 
27 January – Debut of the medical drama Dangerfield on BBC1, starring Nigel Le Vaillant.
29 January – The start of BBC2's weekly roundup of proceedings in the O. J. Simpson murder trial with The Trial of O. J. Simpson.
30 January – The most watched episode of Brookside is broadcast on Channel 4 where the body of Trevor Jordache was found under the patio.

February
3 February – An edition of the live morning ITV discussion show The Time, The Place abruptly ends ten minutes early after an item about men's fashion featured a black male model wearing a skirt while another black man in the audience starts complaining that the show is racist, eventually making his way onto the stage.
5 February – The network television premiere of the classic 1990 holiday film Home Alone on ITV, starring Macaulay Culkin, Joe Pesci, Daniel Stern, John Heard and Catherine O'Hara.
10 February – After a pilot episode was broadcast in December 1993, the first full series of The Mrs Merton Show starts on BBC2, presented by Caroline Aherne as the titular character. 
13 February – The network television premiere of Deceived on ITV, starring Goldie Hawn and John Heard. 
15 February – As part of the Modern Times series, BBC2 airs Death on Request, a Dutch documentary showing a doctor giving a terminally-ill patient a lethal injection of drugs. The programme is criticized by groups opposed to euthanasia.
16 February – Cable channel Wire TV is sold to Mirror Television, a subsidiary of Mirror Group plc. It plans to launch Sportswire as a full-time channel and replace Wire TV with a new channel called L!VE TV.
19 February – The 10th anniversary of the launch of the soap EastEnders on BBC1. As part of the celebrations, the first 25 episodes from 1985 are repeated each morning at 10am during February and March, starting from episode one on Monday 20 February and ending on Friday 26 May. while selected episodes from 1985 and 1986 are also repeated on BBC1 on Friday evenings at 8:30pm for a short while. Billed as The Unforgettable EastEnders the episodes aired are as follows:
17 February: The identity of the father of Michelle Fowler's baby is revealed in October 1985.
24 February: Michelle and Lofty's wedding day in September 1986.
3 March: Den Watts hands Angie divorce papers on Christmas Day 1986, an episode originally watched by over 30 million viewers.
10 March: Two-hander episode featuring Dot and Ethel from July 1987.
25 February 
BBC2 airs a documentary about The Rev. W. Awdry called The Thomas the Tank Engine Man as part of their Bookmark series. It is narrated by Hilary Fortnam, Awdry's daughter and includes a look at the Thomas merchandise, the success of Thomas, images from the original Railway Series books with stock narration by John Gielgud, interviews with several people such as The Reverend himself, fans of Thomas, Awdry's son Christopher, children's author and poet Michael Rosen, various people who worked on the books and toys, Brian Sibley who also wrote the Reverend's autobiography, the people behind the television broadcasts and rights of Thomas in Japan and the producers of the television series Britt Allcroft and David Mitton, plus a special behind the scenes peek of the 100th episode Thomas and the Special Letter and the Reverend criticizing the third series episode Henry's Forest.
The final episode of the light entertainment series Don't Forget Your Toothbrush is broadcast on Channel 4. 
27–28 February – Sky One airs Episode 404 of E Street, the final episode of the Australian soap, splitting the hour-long edition into two half-hour episodes.

March
4 March – Channel 4 airs "Pot Night", eight hours of programming dedicated to cannabis.
11 March – Channel 4 begins airing a rerun of the Dick Clement and Ian La Frenais' comedy-drama Auf Wiedersehen, Pet which made its debut on ITV on 11 November 1983. Also this day sees the debut of "Red Light Zone", a season of "late-night programming focusing on sex, the sex industries and sexual tourism". The strand runs weekly for eight weeks.
17 March – The Night of Comic Relief, the 1995 Comic Relief telethon is broadcast on BBC1.
20 March — Film 95 reports about illegally-rented pirate videos, repeating claims that piracy, helped by the Federation Against Copyright Theft, is directly funding organised crime, counterfeiting currency, the drugs trade and child pornography.
24 March 
Following the recent death of James Herriot, BBC1 airs A Tribute to James Herriot in which Robert Hardy introduces a 1980 episode of the series All Creatures Great and Small which was based on Herriot's memoirs as a Yorkshire vet.
The final episode of The Word is broadcast on Channel 4 after five years on the air.
29 March – Trinity College, Cambridge wins the 1994–95 series of University Challenge on BBC2, beating New College, Oxford 390–180.
30 March – The third series of the hugely popular sitcom Absolutely Fabulous begins on BBC1.

April
1 April 
The action/science-fiction series Bugs makes its debut on BBC1. 
The US medical drama Chicago Hope makes its UK debut on BBC1. 
3 April – A Scottish Court imposes a prohibition on BBC Scotland airing an edition of Panorama that includes an interview with Prime Minister John Major amid concerns it could affect local elections to be held on 6 April. However, the edition is broadcast in England and Wales.
10 April – Conservative MP Jonathan Aitken calls a televised press conference three hours before the transmission of a World in Action film, Jonathan of Arabia, demanding that allegations about his dealings with leading Saudis to be withdrawn. He promises to wield "the simple sword of truth and the trusty shield of British fair play ... to cut out the cancer of bent and twisted journalism." After launching a subsequent libel case against the makers of the film, Aitken is sentenced to 18 months in prison for perjuring himself.
17 April – ITV airs an adaptation of the Joanna Trollope novel A Village Affair.
21 April – Channel 4 airs the first episode of the Irish sitcom Father Ted starring Dermot Morgan and Ardal O'Hanlon.
22 April – Fully Booked replaces Parallel 9 as BBC1's Saturday morning Summer children's show. 
28 April – The hugely popular US sitcom Friends and the US medical drama ER both make their UK debuts on Channel 4.
29 April 
The final edition of ITV's Saturday morning show What's Up Doc? is broadcast. It is replaced the following Saturday by Scratchy & Co..
The final episode of You Bet! presented by Matthew Kelly is broadcast on ITV.

May
1 May – ITV airs what is billed as a one-off episode of Boon. The episode, Thieves Like Us was originally due to air at the end of series 7 in 1992/93. No reason for this delay has ever been given as the record wait has been two or three years long.
2 May 
Closing date for applications to run Channel 5. Four bids are received, from New Century TV Ltd (British Sky Broadcasting, Goldman Sachs, Granada Group, Hoare Govett, Kinnevik, Polygram, Really Useful Group and TCI International) who bid £2,000,000, Virgin TV Ltd with a bid of £22,002,000, UKTV (CanWest Global Communications Corp., Scandinavian Broadcast System SA, SelectTV Plc, The Ten Group Ltd) who bid £36,261,158 and Channel 5 Broadcasting Ltd (MAI (now United News and Media Plc), CLT/UFA, Pearson Plc, Warburg Pincus & Co) with a bid of £22,002,000.
Debut of News '45, a news bulletin-style programme presented by Sue Lawley to mark the 50th anniversary of VE Day on BBC1. 
8 May 
The 50th anniversary of VE Day is widely marked with a series of television programmes.
The network television premiere of Boyz n the Hood on BBC2, starring Ice Cube and Cuba Gooding Jr.
9 May – The US/Canadian police comedy drama Due South makes its UK debut on BBC1.
13 May – Norway's Secret Garden win the 1995 Eurovision Song Contest with "Nocturne".
15 May – Bruce Gyngell, the former chairman of the breakfast station TV-am, becomes Yorkshire–Tyne Tees Television's managing director.
25 May–24 June – ITV provides coverage of the 1995 Rugby World Cup from South Africa as the first Rugby World Cup to be held entirely in one country, since it was banned during the apartheid regime.
31 May 
Debut of the new twice-weekly soap Castles on BBC1, focusing on the lives of the middle-class Castle family. The series attracts a relatively poor peak time audience of 3.2 million, leading the corporation's head of Drama, Charles Denton to brand it a failure. It is cancelled after 26 episode with the last episode airing on 20 August.
Cable channel Wire TV is closed by its new owner as part of a plan to split it into two separate channels. L!VE TV which would replace Wire, with their evening Sportswire programming block launching as a full-time service.

June
12 June – Mirror Group Newspapers launches the cable channel L!VE TV. It launches as a channel which broadcasts live programming based around three blocks of live broadcasting each day from its base on the 24th floor of London's Canary Wharf. The output is orientated towards a rolling mix of celebrities, interviews, reviews, lifestyle features and reports from events and happenings across the UK.
20 June – The network television premiere of Tony Scott's 1991 buddy action comedy film The Last Boy Scout on ITV, starring Bruce Willis and Damon Wayans.
22 June – Prime Minister John Major's intention to resign and stand in a Conservative Party leadership election is announced on screen as England are playing France in the Rugby World Cup third place play off.
29 June – Debut of Gaytime TV on BBC2, the BBC's first gay magazine programme.
June – TCI, owners of Telewest and NYNEX do a deal with BSkyB which includes a clause that the cable operators do not launch any rival channels to those already operated by Sky. This marks the end of Cable Program Partners One (CPP1) which had been set up to try to provide alternative content to the satellite-dominated multi-channel environment of the time and causes the collapse of sports channel Sportswire days before its launch.

July
3 July – Bell Cablemedia is formed when a number of cable companies, including Jones Cable UK, merge.
8 July 
BBC1 repeats the documentary Girl Friday, in which Joanna Lumley spends nine days on a desert island with just a basic survival kit and a film crew.
Lee Griffiths wins the sixth series of Stars in Their Eyes on ITV, performing as Bobby Darin.
The final episode of the long-running darts-based game show Bullseye is broadcast on ITV, it would be briefly revived on Challenge in 2006. 
9 July
For the first time, the BBC shows live coverage of the Wimbledon Championships – Men's singles final in tennis on BBC1. Previously, it had been shown on BBC2 as part of Sunday Grandstand.
Marion Macfarlane wins the 1995 series of MasterChef on BBC1. 
26 July – BBC Enterprises, the BBC's commercial arm, is restructured as BBC Worldwide Ltd.

August
2 August – Channel 4 begins a season of documentaries and features for gay and lesbian viewers.
10 August – The final episode of The Crystal Maze is broadcast on Channel 4, it would be revived in 2016. 
14 August – The sitcom Oh, Doctor Beeching! makes its debut on BBC1. 
15 August – Sue Lawley presents News '45: VJ Day on BBC1 to mark the 50th anniversary of VJ Day and the conclusion of World War II. 
17 August – ITV airs the 2,000th episode of Emmerdale.
27 August – Speaking at the Edinburgh Television Festival, Michael Mansfield QC, one of Britain's leading barristers calls for television cameras to be admitted into English courts to help demystify the legal process and restore public confidence in it.
28 August – The Krypton Factor returns to ITV after a two year break with a new format, presented by Gordon Burns with Penny Smith. 
30 August – The first National Television Awards are held at the Wembley Conference Centre and presented by Eammon Holmes.

September
2 September 
Dyke TV, the first television series aimed at lesbians makes its debut on Channel 4.
The game show Raise the Roof makes its debut on ITV, presented by Bob Holness in which contestants can win a house worth £100,000. However, the series is not a success and it is axed in January 1996. 
4 September 
Carlton introduces new idents. 
The Price Is Right is relaunched under the name Bruce's Price Is Right, presented by Bruce Forsyth. 
5 September 
The US animated fantasy sitcom featuring Felix the Cat called The Twisted Tales of Felix the Cat makes its UK debut on ITV before airing in its homeland on 16 September. 
Jill Dando succeeds Sue Cook as co-presenter of Crimewatch alongside Nick Ross.
10 September – BBC Wales relaunches its rugby union coverage under the name of Scrum V. It replaces Rugby Special Wales.
11 September
The children's stop-motion animated series Oakie Doke makes its debut on BBC1.
The final episode of the long-running dance competition Come Dancing is broadcast on BBC1, although special episodes would air until 1998. 
12 September 
The children's animated series Oscar's Orchestra, featuring the voice of Dudley Moore makes its debut on BBC1. The series is designed to inspire children with the delights of classical music and incorporates orchestral works from famous composers such as Ludwig van Beethoven and Johann Sebastian Bach.
Debut of the sitcom Is It Legal? on ITV and later on Channel 4. 
14 September – Debut of the sports-themed comedy panel show They Think It's All Over on BBC1, presented by Nick Hancock. 
15 September – The popular children's stop-motion animated series Noddy's Toyland Adventures airs on Network 2. This was the first time it has been shown in Ireland, although viewers with access to the BBC and various British television channels were able to see earlier transmissions, including the series original debut on 29 September 1992. 
24 September 
Pride and Prejudice, the massively popular TV adaptation of Jane Austen's novel, makes its debut on BBC1. The six-part serial finishes on 29 October.
The network television premiere of the baseball drama The Babe on BBC2, starring John Goodman as American baseball legend George Herman ‘‘Babe’’ Ruth.
28 September – Star Trek: Deep Space Nine makes its UK debut on BBC2 with the feature-length episode Emissary.
September 
STV acquires a 20% stake in HTV worth £36 million as part of a deal with Flextech.
Janet Street-Porter resigns from L!VE TV and is replaced by Kelvin MacKenzie who axes the rolling content and replaces it with programmes that quickly earns it a reputation as tabloid television.

October
1 October 
Six years after it was originally planned, the British version of the Disney Channel goes on the air. 
The Sci-Fi Channel launches. However, its full schedule, 8am to 2am, is only available to cable viewers as satellite subscribers are only able to see the channel for a few hours each day as it shares transponder space with a number of other channels.
The UK's first Christian channel, Christian Channel Europe launches. It broadcasts for three hours each day, between 4am and 7am.
7–28 October – Cable channel L!VE TV broadcasts matches from the 1995 Rugby League World Cup. It shows many of them exclusively because apart from the opening game, the BBC does not show any live matches until the semi-final stage.
8 October 
BBC2 airs the final edition of The Trial of O. J. Simpson as coverage of the trial draws to a conclusion.
The BBC's subscription service BBC Select ends after three years on the air. 
9 October – Launch of The Learning Zone, an education service shown overnight on BBC2.
12 October – ITV airs Bait, an episode of The Bill that concludes a three-part story and sees the exit of the character Jo Morgan, played by Mary Jo Randle who is shot while trying to warn June Ackland (Trudie Goodwin) of an impending attack on her car.
15 October – The final episode of Challenge Anneka is broadcast on BBC1. 
16 October 
After 25 years as Coronation Street landlady Bet Lynch, Julie Goodyear makes her final regular appearance in the soap. She briefly returned to the show in 2002 and 2003 and starred in a spin-off series, Coronation Street: After Hours in 1999. At the time of her departure, Goodyear had recently received a Lifetime Achievement Award at the inaugural National Television Awards.
 ITV airs a five-part documentary every weekday celebrating 40 years of their children's input since the launch of the network in 1955, Simply the Best: CITV. Thomas the Tank Engine and Friends receives its only mention on Wednesday after three series. 
20 October – Channel 5 Broadcasting Limited is awarded the licence to launch Channel 5. It is a consortium of four investors, Pearson, United News and Media, CLT-Ufa and Warburg Pincus.
21 October 
Comedian Jim Davidson succeeds Bruce Forsyth as presenter of The Generation Game on BBC1.
The short-lived US science-fiction series VR.5 makes its debut on Sky One.
The network television premiere of Sheldon Lettich's 1991 American martial arts action thriller Double Impact on ITV, starring Jean-Claude Van Damme, Geoffrey Lewis, Alan Scarfe, Bolo Yeung and Philip Chan Yan Kin, with a special appearance by female bodybuilding champion and fitness expert Cory Everson.
22 October – Jenna Tinson wins the 1995 series of Junior MasterChef on BBC1. 
23 October – The first episode of the soap Hollyoaks is broadcast on Channel 4.

November
1 November – Four more satellite and cable channels launch in the UK with European Business News, Playboy TV, The Paramount Channel and Sky Sports Gold.
11 November 
The History Channel launches in the UK.
The network television premiere of The Bodyguard on ITV, starring Kevin Costner and singer Whitney Houston.
12 November – BBC2 airs Twin Peaks: Fire Walk with Me, David Lynch's 1992 prequel to the acclaimed series Twin Peaks, starring Sheryl Lee, Ray Wise and Kyle MacLachlan.
13 November – Debut of the sitcom The Thin Blue Line on BBC1, starring Rowan Atkinson. 
20 November 
Zee TV launches in the UK.
The cookery series Can't Cook, Won't Cook makes its debut on BBC1. 
The final episode of The Krypton Factor is broadcast on ITV, although it would be revived in 2009. 
During an hour-long interview with Martin Bashir for the BBC's Panorama, The Princess of Wales speaks about her marriage to The Prince of Wales (now Charles III), his affair with Camilla Parker-Bowles and admits to her intimate relationship with James Hewitt. An estimated 22.78 million watch the interview, the all-time record for a British current affairs programme. It is subsequently acknowledged by the BBC that Bashir had used forged documents to win Diana's trust to secure the interview.
22 November – After Virgin TV challenges the ITC's decision to award the licence to run the UK's fifth television channel to Channel 5 Broadcasting Ltd, the High Court grants leave for a judicial review into the decision.
26 November – ITV airs The Beatles Anthology, an eight-part documentary series chronicling the career of The Beatles which leads to the release of two previously unreleased songs, "Free as a Bird" and "Real Love".

December
2–3 December – Channel 4 airs "Soap Weekend", a weekend of programming dedicated to soap operas with documentaries and classic episodes of series including EastEnders, Neighbours and Brookside.
7 December – PText, the Paramount Comedy Channel's teletext service begins showing old episodes of the ORACLE soap, Park Avenue. After showing the first four episodes, from 11 December they switch to episode 376, in doing so in order that the dates correspond, i.e., 11 December in the soap is also 11 December for the viewers. In all, PText showed 700 episodes of Park Avenue.
15 December – The final episode of Mr. Bean is broadcast on ITV with The Best Bits of Mr. Bean. 
24 December – A Close Shave, the third short film starring Wallace and Gromit makes its debut on BBC2, featuring the voices of Peter Sallis and Anne Reid. 
25 December 
Christmas Day highlights on BBC1 include the network television premiere of Indecent Proposal, starring Robert Redford, Demi Moore and Woody Harrelson.
The final episode of the sitcom Keeping Up Appearances is broadcast on BBC1. 
31 December – New Year's Eve highlights on BBC1 include Songs of Praise on Ice from the Blackpool Pleasure Beach Ice Arena and the network television premiere of Baz Luhrmann's 1992 comedy romance Strictly Ballroom.
December – Channel 4 airs the documentary Sex with Paula in which Paula Yates talks to celebrities about their love lives. Originally made in 1986, the programme was deemed to be unsuitable for audiences at the time, due to its perceived message of promiscuity at the height of the AIDS epidemic.

Debuts

BBC1
1 January 
Little Lord Fauntleroy (1995)
Cold Comfort Farm (1995)
3 January – Timekeepers (1995–1996)
4 January – Elidor (1995)
5 January 
Down to Earth (1995)
Robinson Sucroe  (1994–1995)
8 January – Tears Before Bedtime (1995)
11 January – The Private Life of Plants (1995)
12 January – Bad Boys (1995–1996)
20 January – The Plant (1995)
21 January – Ghosts (1995)
27 January – Dangerfield (1995–1999)
5 February – The Buccaneers (1995)
15 February – The Biz (1995–1997)
23 February – Crown Prosecutor (1995)
2 March – Glad Rags (1995)
12 March – The Choir (1995)
26 March – Hamish Macbeth (1995–1997)
1 April 
Bugs (1995–1999)
Chicago Hope (1994–2000)
4 April – Monty the Dog who wears glasses (1995)
14 April – BBC Wildlife Specials (1995–present)
9 May – Due South (1994–1999)
13 May – Rumble (1995)
14 May – The Hanging Gale (1995)
15 May – Next of Kin (1995–1997)
21 May – The Vet (1995–1996)
23 May – Out of the Blue (1995–1996)
31 May 
Castles (1995)
Monkhouse's Memory Masters (1995)
11 June – Oliver's Travels (1995)
27 June – Bump in the Night (1994–1995)
26 July – Match of the Seventies (1995–1996)
27 July – Resort to Murder 1995)
14 August – Oh, Doctor Beeching! (1995–1997)
28 August – Atletico Partick (1995–1996)
4 September – The Peter Principle (1995–1997, 2000)
7 September 
Backup (1995–1997)
Oakie Doke (1995–1996)
12 September – Oscar's Orchestra (1995–2000)
13 September – People's Century (1995–1997)
14 September – They Think It's All Over (1995–2006)
19 September – How to Be a Little Sod (1995)
24 September – Pride and Prejudice (1995)
29 September – Julia Jekyll and Harriet Hyde (1995–1998)
5 November – The Final Cut (1995)
13 November – The Thin Blue Line (1995–1996)
15 November – The Queen's Nose (1995–2003)
20 November – Can't Cook, Won't Cook (1995–2000)
23 December – Nick and Noel (1993)
30 December – Iznogoud (1995)
31 December – Black Hearts in Battersea (1995–1996)
Unknown – Devil's Advocate (1995)

BBC2
5 January – Jeremy Clarkson's Motorworld (1995–1996)
7 January – The Last Machine (1995) (film documentary)
16 January – Signs and Wonders (1995)
10 February – The Mrs Merton Show (1995–1998) 
13 February – Blood and Peaches (1995)
23 February – The Glam Metal Detectives (1995)
27 February – Game On (1995–1998)
11 April – Fist of Fun (1995–1996)
16 April – Persuasion (1995)
22 April – Fully Booked (1995–1999)
1 May – The Outer Limits (1995–2002)
15 May – The Music Biz (1995) (music documentary)
24 June 
The Saturday Night Armistice (1995–1999)
Rock Family Trees (1995)
29 June – Gaytime TV (1995–1999)
18 August – Pulp Video (1995)
3 September – The Death of Yugoslavia (1995)
12 September – Nautilus (1995) (documentary series)
13 September – Degrees of Error (1995)
16 September – Love Bites (Anthology – 3 dramas: Go Now / Loved Up / In Your Dreams) (1995)
14 October – The Widowing of Mrs. Holroyd (1995)
16 October – Going, Going, Gone (1995–1998)
19 October – In the Company of Men (1995)
16 November – Ghostbusters of East Finchley (1995)
17 November – Coogan's Run (1995)
24 December – A Close Shave (1995)

ITV
2 January – A Mind to Murder (1995)
3 January – Kavanagh QC (1995–2001)
6 January – The Glass Virgin (1995)
9 January – Lucky Numbers (1995–1997)
1 February – Thief Takers (1995)
10 February – Tales from the Cryptkeeper (1993–1999)
20 February – Beyond Reason (1995)
26 February – The Gambling Man (1995)
5 March – The Vacillations of Poppy Carew (1995)
6 March – She's Out (1995)
9 March – Chiller (1995)
12 March – Band of Gold (1995–1997)
15 March – Cone Zone (1995–1997)
4 April – My Good Friend (1995–1996)
5 April – Sharman (1995–1996)
13 April – The Baldy Man (1995–1998)
17 April – A Village Affair (1995)
6 May – Scratchy & Co. (1995–1998)
14 May – The Governor (1995–1996)
22 May – Bramwell (1995–1998)
23 May – Dangerous Lady (1995)
5 June – Caribou Kitchen (1995–1996)
8 June – Searching (1995)
10 July – Barbara (1995–2003)
17 July – Sometime, Never (1995–1996)
2 September 
Gladiators: Train 2 Win (1995–1998)
Raise the Roof (1995–1996)
4 September – The Slow Norris (1995–1999)
5 September – The Twisted Tales of Felix the Cat (1995–1997)
6 September – The Perfect Match (1995)
7 September – Fantomcat (1995–1996)
10 September – The Famous Five (1995–1997)
11 September – The Singing Kettle News (1995–2000)
12 September – Is It Legal? (1995–1998)
9 October 
Paparazzo (1995)
Wolves, Witches and Giants (1995–1999)
11 October – Bliss (1995–1997)
24 October – Sylvester and Tweety Mysteries (1995–2000)
26 October – My Kind of People (1995)
27 October – Freakazoid! (1995–1997)
17 November – Faith in the Future (1995–1998)
19 November – The Beatles Anthology (1995)
10 December – Pinky and the Brain (1995–1998)
25 December – The Little Engine That Could (1991)
28 December – McCallum (1995–1998)

Channel 4
16 February – Hearts and Minds (1995)
20 March – Deadline (1995)
21 April – Father Ted (1995–1998)
28 April 
Friends (1994–2004)
ER (1994–2009)
4 May – Paul Merton's Life of Comedy (1995)
16 May – The Politician's Wife (1995)
21 May – A Personal Journey with Martin Scorsese Through American Movies (1995)
4 September – One for the Road (1995)
12 October – Jake's Progress (1995)
23 October – Hollyoaks (1995–present)
13 November – Porkpie (1995–1996)
24 November – Dressing for Breakfast  (1995–1998)
25 November – England, My England (1995)
24 December – The Adventures of Mole (1995)

S4C
5 September – Rownd a Rownd (1995–present)

Sky Sports (1/2)
August – Soccer AM (1995–present)

Channels

New channels

Defunct channels

Television shows

Returning this year after a break of one year or longer
Boon (1986–1992, 1995)
Chain Letters (1987–1990, 1995–1997)
The Price Is Right (1984–1988, 1995–2001, 2006–2007)

Ending this year
The Tomorrow People (1973–1979, 1992–1995)
Why Don't You? (1973–1995)
We Are the Champions (TV series) (1973–1995)
The Krypton Factor (1977–1995, 2009–2010)
Bullseye (1981–1995, 2006)
Boon (1986–1992, 1995)
The DJ Kat Show (1986–1995)
Allsorts (1986–1995)
A Bit of Fry & Laurie (1989–1995)
Challenge Anneka (1989–1995, 2006)
Keeping Up Appearances (1990–1995) 
The Crystal Maze (1990–1995, 2016–2020)
The Dreamstone (1990–1995)
Mr. Bean (1990–1995)
Bottom (1991–1995)
What's Up Doc? (1992–1995)
The Animals of Farthing Wood (1993–1995)
The Legends of Treasure Island (1993–1995)
Alphabet Castle (1993–1995)
The High Life (1994–1995)
Arthur C. Clarke's Mysterious Universe (1994–1995)
Don't Forget Your Toothbrush (1994–1995)
Scavengers (1994–1995)
Incredible Games (1994–1995)
Knowing Me Knowing You (1994–1995)
The All New Alexei Sayle Show (1994–1995)
Ain't Misbehavin' (1994–1995)
Castles (1995)

Births
23 January – Holly Kenny, actress
1 February – Richard Wisker, actor, singer and presenter
10 February – Archie Madekwe, actor
30 March – Simone Ashley, actress
16 April – Poppy Lee Friar, actress 
17 April – Phoebe Dynevor, actress
4 May – Alex Lawther, actor
9 July – Georgie Henley, actress
17 August – Jessie Mei Li, actress
26 August – Hannah van der Westhuysen, actress
31 August – Ceallach Spellman, actor and radio DJ
15 November – Amy James-Kelly, actress

Deaths

See also
 1995 in British music
 1995 in British radio
 1995 in the United Kingdom
 List of British films of 1995

References